A truism is a claim that is so obvious or self-evident as to be hardly worth mentioning, except as a reminder or as a rhetorical or literary device, and is the opposite of falsism.

In philosophy, a sentence which asserts incomplete truth conditions for a proposition may be regarded as a truism. An example of such a sentence would be "Under appropriate conditions, the sun rises."  Without contextual supporta statement of what those appropriate conditions arethe sentence is true but incontestable. 

Lapalissades, such as "If he were not dead, he would still be alive", are considered to be truisms.

See also 

 Aphorism
 Axiom
 Cliché
 Contradiction
 Dictum
 Dogma
 Figure of speech
 Maxim
 Moral
 Platitude
 Synthetic proposition
 Tautology

References 

Rhetoric
Paremiology